Coelioxys coturnix is a species of bee in the family Megachilidae.

References

Further reading

External links

 

coturnix
Articles created by Qbugbot
Insects described in 1884